This is a list of rivers in Cambodia.

By drainage basin
This list is arranged by drainage basin, with respective tributaries indented under each larger stream's name.

South China Sea
Saigon River
Mekong
Bassac River (Tonle Bassac; distributary)
Tonlé Sap
Krang Ponley River (Stung Krang Ponley)
Boribo River (Stung Boribo)
Chinit River (Stung Chinit)
Kambot River (Chinit River)
Slap River (Stung Slap)
Tang Krasang River (Stung Tag Krasang)
Sen River (Stung Sen)
Sraka Moan River (Stung Sraka Moan)
Kambot River (Sen River)
Stoung River (Stung Stoung)
Neang Sa Sngach River (Stung Neang Sa Sngach)
Chickreng River (Stung Chickreng)
Pursat River (also Pothisat River; Stung Pursat, also Stung Pothisat)
Peam River (Stung Peam)
Moung Russey River (Stung Moung Russey)
Roluos River (Stung Roluos)
Siem Reap River (Stung Siem Reap)
Kambot River (Tonlé Sap)
Sangker River (also Sang Ke River; Stung Sangker, also Stung Sang Ke)
Chas River (Stung Chas)
Sreng River (Stung Sreng)
Battambang River (Stung Battambang)
Mongkol Borei River (Stung Mongkol Borei)
Pheas River (Stung Pheas)
Kampong Krasaing River (Stung Kampong Krasaing)
Sisophon River (Stung Sisophon)
Svay Chek River (Stung Svay Chek)
Tonlé San
Kong River (Stung Kong)
Srepok River (Stung Srepok)

Gulf of Thailand
Kampong Trak River (Stung Kampong Trak)
Kah Bpow River (Stung Kah Bpow)
Tatai River (Stung Tatai)

References 

Cambodia
Rivers